Charles Turnbull Mannes (25 October 1863 — 29 December 1937) was a Scottish first-class cricketer and educator.

Mannes was born at Glasgow in October 1863. A club cricketer for Drumpellier Cricket Club from 1888 to 1914, he made his debut for Scotland in first-class cricket against the touring West Indians at Edinburgh in 1906. He made two further first-class appearances for Scotland, playing against the touring South Africans in 1907, and Nottinghamshire in 1908. He scored 129 runs in his three matches at an average of 21.50; he made one half century, a score of 62 against the South Africans. Although he did not bowl at first-class level, Mannes was considered one of the greatest all-round cricketers that Scotland had produced. In club cricket, he scored 49 centuries. Outside of cricket, Mannes spent many years as an assistant master at The Clarkston School in Airdrie, later becoming its headmaster. He retired from teaching in 1927, and later died at his Airdrie home in December 1937.

References

External links
 

1863 births
1937 deaths
Cricketers from Glasgow
Scottish cricketers
Scottish schoolteachers
Heads of schools in Scotland